Bassfield is a town in Jefferson Davis County, Mississippi, United States. The population was 254 at the 2010 census, down from 315 at the 2000 census. As of 2017, the estimated population was 216.

Geography
Bassfield is located in southeastern Jefferson Davis County at  (31.497090, -89.746008). Mississippi Highway 42 passes through the town, leading northwest  to Prentiss, the county seat, and southeast  to Sumrall. Mississippi Highway 35 passes through the west side of Bassfield, leading north  to Mount Olive and south  to Columbia.

2020 tornadoes

On April 12th, 2020, at approximately 4:15 CDT, Bassfield was struck by a large, violent EF4 tornado, causing catastrophic damage. The town just barely avoided being hit again when a large EF3 tornado passed just north of the city only 35 minutes later.

Demographics

As of the census of 2000, there were 315 people, 124 households, and 76 families residing in the town. The population density was 290.4 people per square mile (112.6/km2). There were 144 housing units at an average density of 132.8 per square mile (51.5/km2). The racial makeup of the town was 64.13% White, 35.56% African American and 0.32% Native American. Hispanic or Latino of any race were 1.27% of the population.

There were 124 households, out of which 24.2% had children under the age of 18 living with them, 41.9% were married couples living together, 16.1% had a female householder with no husband present, and 38.7% were non-families. 36.3% of all households were made up of individuals, and 20.2% had someone living alone who was 65 years of age or older. The average household size was 2.31 and the average family size was 3.08.

In the town, the population was spread out, with 20.3% under the age of 18, 9.2% from 18 to 24, 23.2% from 25 to 44, 19.0% from 45 to 64, and 28.3% who were 65 years of age or older. The median age was 43 years. For every 100 females, there were 71.2 males. For every 100 females age 18 and over, there were 69.6 males.

The median income for a household in the town was $18,500, and the median income for a family was $27,500. Males had a median income of $17,292 versus $14,250 for females. The per capita income for the town was $13,283. About 22.7% of families and 25.0% of the population were below the poverty line, including 24.1% of those under age 18 and 34.8% of those age 65 or over.

Education
Bassfield is served by the Jefferson Davis County School District. The school district was taken over by the state of Mississippi due to low graduation rates and mismanaged finances.

Notable residents
 Cornell Armstrong, professional football player
 A. J. Moore, professional football player
 C. J. Moore, professional football player
 Wilbur Myers, former defensive back for the Denver Broncos
 Ronnie Shows, U.S. congressman (1999–2003)

Gallery

References

Towns in Jefferson Davis County, Mississippi
Towns in Mississippi